Jack Christopher Stamp Brooksbank (born 3 May 1986) is an English bar manager and brand ambassador. He is the husband of Princess Eugenie, a niece of King Charles III.

Early life and family

Brooksbank was born on 3 May 1986 at St Thomas' Hospital in Lambeth, London. He was christened at Guards Chapel, Wellington Barracks in Wellington Barracks. He is the eldest son of Old Etonian George Edward Hugh Brooksbank (1949–2021), a company director and chartered accountant, and his wife Nicola (née Newton; born 1953), great-granddaughter of  both Sir Arthur Holland (1843–1928) and Sir Frederick Charlton Meyrick, 2nd Baronet.  He is in remainder to the Brooksbank baronetcy.

A half-third cousin twice-removed of Princess Eugenie through Thomas Coke, 2nd Earl of Leicester, Brooksbank's great-grandfather was Sir John (Jack) Spencer Coke, a Gentleman Usher to King George VI and Extra Gentleman Usher to Queen Elizabeth II and his great-uncle was the 3rd Baron Hamilton of Dalzell. Jack has a younger brother, Thomas, who is also an Old Etonian.

Education and career
Brooksbank was educated at Stowe School in Buckinghamshire, and the University of Bristol, which he left without earning a degree. His first job in the bar industry was as a bartender, before becoming the general manager of Mahiki, a nightclub in Mayfair that was often visited by his wife's cousins Prince William and Prince Harry in their youth. He later worked as a brand ambassador for Casamigos tequila. He was also reported to have his own wine wholesale business. In 2022, he began working in marketing, sales and promotion for property developer Michael Meldman's Discovery Land Company in Portugal.

Marriage and family

In 2011, Brooksbank began dating Princess Eugenie of York, the younger daughter of Prince Andrew, Duke of York, and Sarah, Duchess of York. They had met in 2010 when Brooksbank was 24 and Princess Eugenie was 20. On 22 January 2018, the Duke of York's office at Buckingham Palace announced their engagement. In April 2018, the couple moved from their residence at St James's Palace to Ivy Cottage, in the grounds of Kensington Palace. Their wedding took place on 12 October 2018, at St George's Chapel, Windsor. Contrary to press speculation that Brooksbank would be created "Earl of Northallerton", he has not been elevated to the peerage after marrying into the royal family, following a trend in recent years for a male commoner not to be awarded one upon marriage to a princess.

The couple's son, August Philip Hawke Brooksbank, was born on 9 February 2021 at the Portland Hospital in London. At his birth, he was eleventh in line to the throne. August was christened on 21 November 2021 at the Royal Chapel of All Saints in Windsor Great Park in a private service attended by Queen Elizabeth II alongside Lucas Tindall, son of Princess Eugenie's cousin Zara Tindall. In January 2023, it was announced that Eugenie was pregnant with the couple's second child.

Honours
National honours
  Queen Elizabeth II Platinum Jubilee Medal

Notes

References

1986 births
Living people
21st-century English businesspeople
Alumni of the University of Bristol
Jack
Businesspeople from London
People educated at Stowe School